Brian Nissen (20 October 1927 in London – 8 February 2001 in Salisbury, Wiltshire) was a British actor and television continuity announcer.

Biography
Nissen made an early appearance in Laurence Olivier's film of Shakespeare's Henry V, and made many TV, film and stage appearances, including The Dam Busters (1955), and the television series The New Adventures of Charlie Chan and Sword of Freedom in 1957. But he is probably best-remembered as an in-vision announcer for Southern Television, where his formal style seemed to sum up the company's aesthetic. He joined Southern at its inception in 1958 and stayed until its demise in 1981, and was kept on by the successor company TVS despite its general policy of breaking with Southern's conservatism. He retired from TVS in August 1987. Nissen died on 8 February 2001 in Salisbury, Wiltshire at the age of 73.

Selected filmography
 The Day Will Dawn (1942) - Page (uncredited)
 The Demi-Paradise (1943) - George Tisdall
 English Without Tears (1944) - (uncredited)
 Henry V (1944) - Court - Soldier in the English Army
 They Were Sisters (1945) - John Watson
 Badger's Green (1949) - Dickie Wetherby
 Landfall (1949) - Lambert (uncredited)
 The Browning Version (1951) - Head Boy (uncredited)
 The Dam Busters (1955) - Flt / Lt. A. T. Taerum, D.F.C.
 Richard III (1955) - Messenger to Richard
 Interpol (1957) - Allison
 Second Fiddle (1957) - Jack Carter
 Top Floor Girl (1959) - Stevens Jr.
 Man Accused (1959) - Derek
 Night Train for Inverness (1960) - Police Radio Operator (uncredited)
 Dentist on the Job (1961) - City Gent
 The Fur Collar (1962) - Carl Jorgensen
 The Marked One (1963) - Chas Warren
 Ring of Spies (1964) - Lt. Downes (uncredited)

References

External links

1927 births
2001 deaths
Radio and television announcers
English male television actors
English male film actors
English male stage actors